Eschatovouni (Greek: Εσχατοβούνι, meaning "nethermost mountain") is a neighbourhood in the northeastern part of the city of Patras. It is the final hill of Dasylio in which it takes the name Eschatovouni.  This neighborhood is near the neighborhood of Gouva.

References
The first version of the article is translated from the article at the Greek Wikipedia (el:Main Page)

Neighborhoods in Patras